John Jones (25 January 1890 – death unknown), also known as Bedwellty Jones, was a Welsh rugby union, and professional rugby league footballer who played in the 1910s. He played representative level rugby union (RU) for Wales, and at club level for Abertillery RFC, as a prop, i.e. number 1 or 3, and club level rugby league (RL) for Oldham, as a forward (prior to the specialist positions of), during the era of contested scrums.

Background
Jones was born in Bedwellty, Wales.

Rugby career
Jack Jones won caps for Wales (RU) while at Abertillery RFC in 1914 against England, Scotland, France, and Ireland. Jones, a collier by trade, was a member of the 'Terrible Eight', the nickname the Wales pack was given by the press in the games against Scotland and Ireland in 1914. Both matches were reported as very abrasive contests.

Just two weeks after his final rugby union international for Wales, in which he scored his only international points, a try against Ireland, he turned professional when he joined rugby league team Oldham. He made his début for Oldham against St. Helens on 4 April 1914, and scored three tries in the match.

References

External links
Search for "Jones" at rugbyleagueproject.org

Statistics at scrum.com
Statistics at wru.co.uk
Statistics at orl-heritagetrust.org.uk

1890 births
Abertillery RFC players
Brynmawr RFC players
Year of death missing
Oldham R.L.F.C. players
Place of death missing
Pontypool RFC players
Rugby league forwards
Rugby league players from Bedwellty
Rugby union players from Bedwellty
Rugby union props
Tredegar RFC players
Wales international rugby union players
Welsh rugby league players
Welsh rugby union players